The Marriage Act 1540 (32 Hen 8 c 38) was an Act of the Parliament of England.

The whole Act was repealed by section 79(1) of, and Part I of Schedule 5 to, the Marriage Act 1949.

A similar Marriage Act, 1542 was passed by the Parliament of Ireland, and part of it remains in force in the Republic of Ireland.

See also
Marriage Act

References
Halsbury's Statutes,

Acts of the Parliament of England (1485–1603)
1540 in law
1540 in England
Marriage, unions and partnerships in England
Marriage law in the United Kingdom